Villars-sur-Glâne railway station is a railway station in the municipality of Villars-sur-Glâne, in the Swiss canton of Fribourg. It is an intermediate stop on the standard gauge Lausanne–Bern line of Swiss Federal Railways.

Services
 the following services stop at Villars-sur-Glâne:

 RER Fribourg  / :
 Weekends: hourly service between Ins and Romont.

References

External links 
 
 

Railway stations in the canton of Fribourg
Swiss Federal Railways stations